Omiodes collinsi is a moth in the family Crambidae. It was described by Whalley in 1962. It is found on the Solomon Islands.

References

Moths described in 1962
collinsi